MacDella Cooper (born March 13, 1977) is a Liberian politician and philanthropist. She is the Standard Bearer of The Movement for One Liberia (MOL) political party.

Born in Monrovia, MacDella Cooper was exiled to Cote D’Ivoire during the outbreak of the First Liberian Civil War before being reunited with her family in the United States.

She graduated from Barringer High School in Newark, New Jersey, where she was one of the top-ranked students in her class, and subsequently earned a full academic scholarship to The College of New Jersey, where she earned a degree in Electronic Communications.

Cooper worked as an international businesswoman for several years before founding the MacDella Cooper Foundation, the MacDella Cooper Academy, and the Movement for One Liberia political party.

In October 2016, Cooper announced her intention to run for the Presidency of Liberia in the 2017 Liberian National Elections.

Early life and education
Cooper was born in Liberia's capital, Monrovia, and lived there until the outbreak of the First Liberian Civil War. The war forced Cooper into exile in neighboring Côte d’Ivoire, where she spent her early teenage years as a refugee until 1993, when she was reunited with her family in the United States. 

She attended Barringer High School in Newark, New Jersey, where she ranked third in her class of 1,200 students.  She was awarded a full academic scholarship to The College of New Jersey in Ewing, New Jersey, where she subsequently earned  a degree in Electronic Communications.

Business career
Cooper began her professional career in fashion marketing and public relations and later branched out into corporate planning, consulting for global organizations like Citi Group, Duca Sartoria and Starwood, among others.  

Cooper has held several leadership, advisory and board positions in the United States, Liberia, and other countries, including representation with humanitarian organizations.

MacDella Cooper Foundation (MCF)
In 2003, Cooper founded the MacDella Cooper Foundation, a 501c3 international charitable organization whose mission is to educate, train and motivate Africa’s most vulnerable children, disadvantaged youth and marginalized women, helping them to become productive contributors to their nations’ economic, social and political development.

The foundation provided the fundamental building block for raising millions of dollars to support national development projects in Liberia. Cooper used her philanthropic platform to advocate for the necessary funds to promote human rights, as well as the protection of women and children.  The foundation also provides access to education, healthcare, affordable housing and employment.

MacDella Cooper Academy 
In December 2010, the MacDella Cooper Foundation opened the first school in Liberia to offer free tuition that includes room and board. Located in Charlesville, Margibi County, Liberia, the MacDella Cooper Academy has the capacity to house 80 students, aged 4 to 13 years. The school's building was designed by award-winning Dutch-American architect Winka Dubbeldam.

The Academy provides quality education and life skills for "at-risk", vulnerable, and disadvantaged children in an environment that is conducive to learning. At the MCF School, students get three meals a day consisting of healthy, locally grown ingredients.

The foundation’s former participants are now internationally recognized performers who have been invited to various events including the official Africa Day celebrations in Paris and the UN Peace Concert in the United States.

Additionally, all eligible children from the MCF Academy successfully wrote and passed their West African Examination Council (WAEC) exams, a regional requirement for recognition within West Africa.

The MCF successfully replaced a severely damaged roof after its collapse, ensuring that children are safe and secure within their classrooms. The Foundation has also constructed a 12th grade classroom  in honor of the Segal Family.

Movement for One Liberia (MOL) Political Party 
MacDella Cooper is the current Standard Bearer for the Movement for One Liberia (MOL), the political party that was founded in 2019 and accredited in 2020. The Movement for One Liberia provides women, youth, and people living with disabilities the opportunity to participate in public office. 

The party’s mission is to provide democratic rights and civil liberties to every Liberian, especially the under-represented - women, youth, disabled, and those with dissimilar orientation.

Political career
On October 17th, 2016, MacDella Cooper publicly announced her candidacy for President of Liberia in the 2017 elections. She was also a candidate for the Montserrado County Senatorial elections held on July 2nd, 2020.

Cooper became the only female candidate running for the nation’s highest office. She emerged 9th, amongst a field that included 19 male candidates, following a brutal, hard-fought and often divisive contest, prompting her to further advocate for equal representation of women in politics and their empowerment in a paternalistic society.

Personal life
MacDella Cooper lives in Monrovia, Liberia with her husband and three children.

References

External links
 MacDella Cooper
MacDella Cooper Foundation
 MacDella Cooper Academy
 MacDella Cooper Election Website
 https://filmfreeway.com/MACDELLA

Living people
1977 births
Barringer High School alumni
Politicians of African nations
Liberian politicians
People from Newark, New Jersey
The College of New Jersey alumni
People from Monrovia